United Nations General Assembly Resolution 37/37 (1983) stated that the Soviet Union forces should withdraw from Afghanistan. It was the fourth time in three years that the General Assembly had called for Soviet withdrawal from that country.

External links 
 text of United Nations General Assembly Resolution 37/37

37 37
Afghanistan conflict (1978–present)
1983 in law
Foreign relations of the Soviet Union
Afghanistan–Soviet Union relations
1983 in the United Nations
1983 in the Soviet Union
1983 in Afghanistan
Afghanistan and the United Nations